Christine Diane Witty (born June 23, 1975) is an American speed skater and racing cyclist and participated in the Olympic Games in both sports.

She won medals at both 1000 and 1500 meters in the 1998 Winter Olympics. In 2002, she won the Olympic gold medal at the 1000 meters in Salt Lake City, setting a world record in the process.

In 1996 she became World Champion Sprint, in 1997 and 1998 she became second and in 2000 she became third.

In 1998 she won the gold medal at the World Single Distance Championships at the 1000 m, in 1996 the silver and in 2000 the bronze medal at the same distance.

In 2000, she placed fifth overall in the 500 m cycling time trials at the 2000 Summer Olympics in Sydney, becoming only the ninth American ever to compete in both the Summer and Winter Olympic Games.

In 2006, she was elected by her teammates to carry the United States flag at the 2006 Winter Olympics in Turin.

Personal life 
Witty has reported that she had experienced childhood abuse from a trusted neighbor since she was 4 till the age of 11 years, and she kept the secret for years. Witty currently lives with her partner, former Dutch long track speed skater Frouke Oonk.

Records 

Source: SpeedskatingResults.com

Source: SpeedSkatingStats.com

Witty holds the 1000m Olympic Record with a time of 1:13.83 which was set at the 2002 Olympic Winter games in the Utah Olympic Oval, Salt Lake City, Utah.

Achievements
1996 World Sprint Championships: gold
1996 World Single Distance Championships, 1000 m: silver
1997 World Sprint Championships: bronze
1998 World Sprint Championships: bronze
1998 Olympic Winter Games, 1000 m: silver
1998 Olympic Winter Games, 1500 m: bronze
1998 World Single Distance Championships, 1000 m: gold
2000 World Sprint Championships: bronze
2000 World Single Distance Championships, 1000 m: bronze
2002 Olympic Winter Games, 1000 m: gold

She competed in track cycling in the 2000 Summer Olympics, where she placed 5th in the 500m time trial.

References

External links
 Chris Witty at SpeedSkatingStats.com
 
 

1975 births
Living people
American female cyclists
Cyclists at the 2000 Summer Olympics
Olympic cyclists of the United States
People from West Allis, Wisconsin
Speed skaters at the 1994 Winter Olympics
Speed skaters at the 1998 Winter Olympics
Speed skaters at the 2002 Winter Olympics
Speed skaters at the 2006 Winter Olympics
Cyclists at the 2003 Pan American Games
World record setters in speed skating
American female speed skaters
Lesbian sportswomen
Medalists at the 2002 Winter Olympics
Medalists at the 1998 Winter Olympics
Sportspeople from Wisconsin
American LGBT sportspeople
LGBT people from Wisconsin
American expatriates in the Netherlands
Olympic gold medalists for the United States in speed skating
Olympic silver medalists for the United States in speed skating
Pan American Games medalists in cycling
Pan American Games silver medalists for the United States
Pan American Games bronze medalists for the United States
LGBT cyclists
LGBT speed skaters
Medalists at the 2003 Pan American Games
21st-century American LGBT people
21st-century American women
Cyclists from Wisconsin